Juvy Cachola was an actress for the Philippines' Sampaguita Pictures.

Filmography

Movies

References

External links
 

Filipino film actresses
Living people
Year of birth missing (living people)